Daal Mein Kuch kaala Hai is a Bollywood film  released in June 2012. it was directed by Anand Balraj and produced By Deepak Bali & Urvashi Bali. The film starred Veena Malik, Jackie Shroff, Aanand Balraj, Shakti Kapoor, Vijay Raaz, Aman Verma and Bobby Darling.

Plot

Daal Mein Kuch Kaala Hai is a tale of a budding actress (Veena Malik) who is over motivated to become a successful in Bollywood. The story starts with Mr. Dabu who is a middle aged man in his forties, a total loser absconded and is being left unaccompanied in life. All of a sudden he gets rich after hitting a roll-over prize of birthright, and then decides to walk off to this actress to share his destiny and his future in the company of her. The starlet gets surprised and shocked after witnessing so much of wealth with him in cash. She initially agrees what his boyfriend had planned out to con Mr. Dabu, but is totally puzzled on what to carry out. They both sooner or later travel to the mysterious island, which is further followed by her boyfriend and a couple of unknown friends. The entire journey is filled with full humor, enjoyment and entertainment.

Cast

 Veena Malik
 Jackie Shroff as Police inspector Fatke Maar
 Aanand Balraj
 Gehana Vasisth
 Vijay Raaz
 Shakti Kapoor
 Aman Verma
 Lilliput
 Raja Chaudhary
 Ali Hassan
 Razak Khan
 Irfan malik
 Varun bal raj
 Bobby Darling
 Shehzad Khan
 Sudesh Berry
 Kishore Bhanushali
 Sunaina Singh
 Sonika gill
 Jeniffer Pereira
 Ramesh goyal
 Heram tripathi
 Haseen mastaan mirza
 Zara
 Abhishek Agarwal aka Abbu Bin Laden
 Asst Director = Priyanka Raina
 Asst Director = Vikaas Gaur

Soundtrack
The music is composed by Aabfm, whereas the lyrics of it are written down by Naresh, Anand Balraj, Nasir and Vijay Akela. The songs are sung by Ritu Pathak, Vinod Rathod, Mamta Sharma, Amit Kumar, Bali Brahmabhatt and Arun Daga.

References

External links
 
 
 
 

2012 films
2010s Hindi-language films
T-Series (company) films